WPSK-FM (107.1 MHz) is a country formatted broadcast radio station licensed to Pulaski, Virginia, serving the New River Valley. WPSK-FM used to be owned and operated by Cumulus Media. On September 6, 2018, Cumulus Media announced it would sell its Blacksburg cluster to Monticello Media. The sale was approved December 1, 2018. WPSK-FM, which had been rebranded under Cumulus' Nash FM brand on February 5, 2014, reverted to its original branding as "107.1 PSK" in 2019, shortly after the sale to Monticello Media.

References

External links
 Nash FM 107-1 Online
 

Country radio stations in the United States
PSK
Radio stations established in 1967
1967 establishments in Virginia